The Assistant Secretary of Defense for Sustainment (ASD(Sustainment)), formerly known as the Assistant Secretary of Defense for Logistics and Materiel Readiness (ASD(L&MR)), is one of three assistant secretaries reporting to the Under Secretary of Defense for Acquisition and Sustainment. Formerly the position was an adviser to the Under Secretary of Defense for Acquisition, Technology and Logistics, Deputy Secretary of Defense, and Secretary of Defense on logistics and materiel readiness issues within the Department of Defense (DoD), including programs related to logistics, materiel readiness, maintenance, strategic mobility, and sustainment support. As the principal logistics official within the senior management of the DoD, the ASD(Sustainment) exercises authority, direction and control over the director of the Defense Logistics Agency. Like all other Assistant Secretaries of Defense, the ASD(Sustainment) is considered a part of the Office of the Secretary of Defense.

History

This position can trace its lineage partially back to the National Security Act of 1947, which established a Munitions Board to oversee logistics and supply within the nascent Defense Department. Through the Kennedy, Johnson, Nixon and Ford administrations, oversight of logistics and materiel readiness was merged with oversight of installations and properties. In 1977, the acquisition functions of this office were transferred to the Director of Defense Research and Engineering, and responsibilities for logistics were merged with manpower and reserve affairs throughout the Carter and early Reagan administrations.

For a year in the middle of the Reagan administration, responsibilities for logistics and materiel support were split between two ASDs after the creation of a new Assistant Secretary of Defense for Development and Support, established by Defense Directive 5129.4 (signed 25 November 1984). However, this office was abolished after Defense Directive 5128.1 (signed in November 1985) merged logistics responsibilities into a single office, the Assistant Secretary of Defense for Acquisition and Logistics. This office was then replaced by the Assistant Secretary of Defense for Production and Logistics in April 1987, and phased out completely in 1993 after the reorganization of the office of the USD (AT&L). From 1993 until 2000, there was no principal staff assistant to the USD (AT&L) responsible for oversight of logistics and materiel readiness.

The National Defense Authorization Act for  Fiscal Year  2000,  (P.L.  106-65, signed 5 October 1999) created the new position of Deputy Under Secretary of Defense for Logistics and Materiel Readiness, or DUSD (L&MR). The DUSD (L&MR) was meant to serve as a second DUSD, after the Principal DUSD, reporting to  the USD (AT&L). According to an official DoD history, the intent of Congress in establishing the DUSD (L&MR) was to emphasize the importance of these functions.

The National Defense Authorization Act for Fiscal Year 2010 (P.L. 111-84, signed 28 October 2009) redesignated this position as the Assistant Secretary of Defense for Logistics and Materiel Readiness, or ASD(L&MR), as part of an overall effort to limit the number of DUSD positions to five. However, this post remained vacant throughout the Obama administration, with Principal Deputy Assistant Secretary of Defense (PDASD) Alan F. Estevez serving as the highest-ranking official in this office.

In February 2018, the Logistics and Materiel Readiness office was combined into a new office, headed by the Assistant Secretary for Sustainment.

As part of a reorganization on 12 October 2018, the ASD(L&MR) was combined with the Assistant Secretary of Defense for Energy, Installations, and Environment (ASD(EI&E)) into a new Assistant Secretary of Defense for Sustainment. The ASD(EI&E) position was reestablished on February 10, 2022.

Office holders

Assistant Secretaries for Logistics and Materiel Readiness 

The table below includes both the various titles of this post over time, as well as all the holders of those offices.

Assistant Secretary for Sustainment

References

External links 
 https://web.archive.org/web/20110516010527/http://www.acq.osd.mil/log/lmr/about_us.htm